Cyprus–Saudi Arabia relations are foreign relations between Cyprus and Saudi Arabia. Cyprus has an embassy in Riyadh and honorary consulate in Jeddah. Saudi Arabia has an embassy in Nicosia. The political relations are close due to similarities between the 2 countries on historical, geographical and economical issues.

History

The excellent relations between Cyprus and Saudi Arabia, as well as the need to further promote the two countries’ Middle East dimension were among the issues that the Minister of Foreign Affairs of Saudi Arabia Saud Al Faisal who has expressed the respect of his country to the territorial integrity of Cyprus and the relevant UN resolutions, during a meeting with his Cypriot counterpart Erato Kozakou-Marcoullis, who paid a visit to Riyadh in 2012.

Saudi Arabian stance on Cyprus dispute
Saudi Arabian stance on the Cyprus dispute remains steadfast, and committed, to the UN Charter and international legality. Minister of Foreign Affairs of Saudi Arabia, Saud Al Faisal, added in 2012 that Saudi Arabia supports a united and federal Cyprus, and opposes any effort for secession or partition regarding all the problems of the region.

See also 
 Foreign relations of Cyprus
 Foreign relations of Saudi Arabia

References

External links 
 
 

 
 
Saudi Arabia
Bilateral relations of Saudi Arabia